Elisabeth Davin (born 3 June 1981) is a Belgian athlete specialising in the sprint hurdles. She represented her country at the 2009 World Championships and 2010 IAAF World Indoor Championships without advancing from the first round. In addition, she won a gold medal at the 2009 Jeux de la Francophonie.

Her personal bests are 12.97 seconds in the 100 metres hurdles (+0.4 m/s, La Chaux-de-Fonds 2009) and 8.02 seconds in the 60 metres hurdles (Paris 2011).

International competitions

References

1981 births
Living people
Belgian female hurdlers
People from Virton
World Athletics Championships athletes for Belgium
Competitors at the 2003 Summer Universiade
Competitors at the 2005 Summer Universiade
Sportspeople from Luxembourg (Belgium)